ProInversion is the Private Investment Promotion Agency of Peru.

Projects 

It is involved in infrastructure projects such as for road and rail.

Board Members

See also 

 Interoceanic Highway connecting Peru with Brazil.
 Mineral industry of Peru
 Lima Metro

References 

Financial services companies of Peru
Organisations based in Lima